Mrs Ratcliffe's Revolution is a 2007 British comedy drama film, directed by Bille Eltringham and starring Catherine Tate, Iain Glen and Brittany Ashworth, about a British family who move to East Germany in 1968, during the Cold War. It was filmed in Hungary and the United Kingdom (UK), and was released on 9 July 2007 at the Cambridge Film Festival, and nationwide in the UK on 28 September.

Cast
 Catherine Tate as Dorothy Ratcliffe
 Iain Glen as Frank Ratcliffe
 Brittany Ashworth as Alex Ratcliffe
 Heike Makatsch as Frau Unger
 Jessica Barden as Mary Ratcliffe
 Christian Brassington as Thomas
 Nigel Betts as Uncle Philip
 Robert Daniel Lowe as Otto
 Ottilia Borbáth as Frau Glock
 Béla Fesztbaum as 1st Stasi Officer
 Fanni Futár as Uti
 Imola Gáspár as Art Teacher
 Ákos Horváth as 2nd Border Guard
 Barna Illyés as Gym Teacher
 John Kirk as Mr. Murray
 Karl Kranzkowski as Rector
 Uwe Lauer as Truck Driver
 Piroska Móga as Ursula
 Ben O'Brien as 2nd Stasi Officer
 Gábor Pintér as 1st Border Guard
 Alexander Scheer as Willi
 Arndt Schwering-Sohnrey as Jerzy
 Katharina Thalbach as Anna
 Susan Tordoff as Mary's Teacher
 Stephan Wolf-Schönburg as Herr Vort

Reception
, Mrs Ratcliffe's Revolution holds an 83% approval rating on Rotten Tomatoes, based on six reviews with an average rating of 5.6/10. Because of its limited release, there were few reviews, but Channel 4 Online and The Guardian Films cited the film as a vehicle for the blooming film careers of both Catherine Tate and Brittany Ashworth. The film won the Audience Award at the Wurzburg International Film Weekend.

References

External links
 Official Site
 
 Guardian Review
 
 Channel 4 Film Review

2007 films
2007 comedy-drama films
British comedy-drama films
2007 comedy films
2007 drama films
Films set in East Germany
2000s English-language films
2000s British films